Convolvulus cantabrica, common name Cantabrican morning glory or dwarf morning glory, is a herbaceous perennial plant belonging to the genus Convolvulus of the family Convolvulaceae.

Description
This bindweed is a hemicryptophyte scapose plant reaching on average  in height. It has simple, alternate, lanceolate leaves, coarsely hairy on both sides. The wide funnel-shaped flowers are actinomorphic ("star shaped", "radial") and arranged on a long petiole at the leaf axils. The corolla is 15–25 mm long and usually pale pink, but it can be completely white. The flowers are hermaphrodite and pollinated by insects (entomogamy). The flowering period extends from May through October. The fruits are globose and pubescent capsules  with 2–4 brownish seeds.

Gallery

Distribution
This species is native to southern Europe and widespread in the Mediterranean coasts.

Habitat

References

 Pignatti S. – Flora d'Italia – Edagricole – 1982. Vol. II, pag. 387
 Acta Plantarum
 Flora.uniud.it

External links
 Biolib
 Hlasek
 C, cantabrica

cantabrica
Plants described in 1753
Taxa named by Carl Linnaeus
Flora of Malta